WVXX is a Spanish Contemporary formatted broadcast radio station licensed to Norfolk, Virginia, serving Hampton Roads.  WVXX is owned and operated by Davidson Media Group.

1050 AM is a Mexican clear-channel frequency.  XEG-AM is the dominant Class A station.

History

WRAP

The 1050 frequency was the original home of WRAP, which signed on in 1952. The station broadcast during the daytime hours only. When Rollins Broadcasting acquired the 850 frequency (then WCAV) in 1954, WRAP moved there on July 1, 1954.

WCMS
When Rollins acquired 850, Cy Blumenthal acquired the 1050 facility and relaunched it as country music outlet WCMS.

In the late 1990s, the station used to simulcast with urban gospel WXEZ-FM 'Star 94.1'. On April 22, 2002, the station became easy listening "AM 1050 The Fog" WFOG. On November 25, 2003, WFOG dropped the standards format to simulcast classic country WCMS 100.5. Three days later, the simulcast ended when WCMS-FM flipped to Mainstream Rock and the classic country format was kept on 1050. Because of an error, the WXMM calls were assigned to 1050 and the WCMS calls stayed on 100.5 until the calls were finally swapped on December 18. On May 1, 2004, the station flipped to FOX Sports Radio.

In November 2004, Barnstable Broadcasting sold the station to Davidson Media and later changed the calls to WVXX on December 6, 2004. FOX Sports Radio was dropped on February 9, 2005 in anticipation of a Spanish format known as "Selecta 1050". Due to technical problems with Verizon, WVXX simulcasted WFOG until "Selecta" was launched at 2 p.m. on February 26, 2005.

References

External links
 Selecta 1050 Online

VXX
Radio stations established in 1954
Spanish-language radio stations in the United States